Fairview Township is a township in Osceola County, Iowa, USA. The city of Harris is located in Fairview Township.

History
Fairview Township was founded in 1874. It was named from the beauty of their land.

References

Townships in Osceola County, Iowa
Townships in Iowa
Populated places established in 1874
1874 establishments in Iowa